Double Cross is the ninth album led by saxophonist Hank Crawford featuring performances recorded in 1965 and 1967 for the Atlantic label.

Reception

AllMusic awarded the album 4½ stars.

Track listing
All compositions by Hank Crawford except as indicated
 "Double Cross" - 3:19
 "Jimmy Mack" (Eddie Holland, Lamont Dozier, Brian Holland) - 2:36
 "Glue Fingers" - 3:27
 "I Can't Stand It" - 4:45
 "In the Heat of the Night" (Alan and Marilyn Bergman, Quincy Jones) - 4:03
 "The Second Time Around" (Jimmy Van Heusen, Sammy Cahn) - 3:52
 "Mud Island Blues" - 5:56
 "Someday (You'll Want Me to Want You)" (Jimmie Hodges) - 3:50

Personnel 
Hank Crawford - alto saxophone, piano
Fielder Floyd (tracks 7 & 8), John Hunt (tracks 7 & 8), Melvin Lastie (tracks 1-6), Joe Newman (tracks 1-6) - trumpet
Tony Studd - trombone (tracks 1-6) 
Wendell Harrison (tracks 7 & 8), David Newman (tracks 1-6) - tenor saxophone
Pepper Adams (tracks 1-6), Alonzo Shaw (track 7 & 8) - baritone saxophone
Carl Lynch - guitar (tracks 1-6)
Jack McDuff - piano (track 5)
Charles Green - bass (tracks 7 & 8)
Jimmy Tyrell - electric bass (tracks 1-6)
Bruno Carr (tracks 1-6), Wilbert Hogan (tracks 7 & 8) - drums

References 

1968 albums
Hank Crawford albums
Atlantic Records albums
Albums produced by Joel Dorn
Albums produced by Arif Mardin